The following is a list of municipalities in Vojvodina province of Serbia, in which ethnic Hungarians form majority or significant minority (i.e. make up over 5% of the total population), according to the 2011 census, ordered by their percentage of the local population. Hungarians form 3.53% of Serbia's total population and 13% of Vojvodina, where most of them are living.

Hungarians are present in the region since the Middle Ages and today they are largest minority in Vojvodina. The Hungarian language is one of the six official languages of the region.

Novi Sad, although does not reach the 5% limit, is also listed as it has one of the largest numbers of Hungarians in one place in Vojvodina and is a regional cultural and educational center of Hungarians with the Hungarian language Novi Sad Theatre and the University of Novi Sad, that beside other minority departments hosts the Department of Hungarian Studies.

References

Hungarians in Vojvodina
Hungarians